Archosargus is a genus of fish in the family Sparidae.

Species
Species include:
 Archosargus aries (Valenciennes in Cuvier and Valenciennes, 1830)
 Archosargus pourtalesii (Steindachner, 1881)
 Archosargus probatocephalus (Walbaum, 1792) – sargo chopa, sheepshead
 Archosargus rhomboidalis (Linnaeus, 1758) – salema, sargo amarillo, sea bream, western Atlantic seabream

References

Sparidae
Marine fish genera
Taxa named by Theodore Gill